A shell account is a user account on a remote server, traditionally running under the Unix operating system, which gives access to a shell via a command-line interface protocol such as telnet, SSH, or over a modem using a terminal emulator.

Shell accounts were made first accessible to interested members of the public by Internet Service Providers (such as Netcom (USA), Panix, The World and Digex), although in rare instances individuals had access to shell accounts through their employer or university. They were used for file storage, web space, email accounts, newsgroup access and software development. Before the late 1990s, shell accounts were often much less expensive than full net access through SLIP or PPP, which was required to access the then-new World Wide Web. Most personal computer operating systems also lacked TCP/IP stacks by default before the mid-1990s. Products such as The Internet Adapter were devised that could work as a proxy server, allowing users to run a web browser for the price of a shell account.

Shell providers are often found to offer shell accounts at low-cost or free. These shell accounts generally provide users with access to various software and services including compilers, IRC clients, background processes, FTP, text editors (such as nano) and email clients (such as pine). Some shell providers may also allow tunneling of traffic to bypass corporate firewalls.

See also
 Bulletin board system
 FreeBSD jail
 Free-net
 SDF Public Access Unix System, one of the oldest and largest non-profit public access UNIX systems on the Internet.
 Slirp, a free software application similar to The Internet Adapter
 SSH tunneling
 The Big Electric Cat was a public access computer system in New York City in the late 1980s, known on Usenet as node dasys1.
 The Internet Adapter, a graphical application front end for internet access using shell accounts allowing TCP/IP-based applications such as Netscape to run over the shell account.
 The WELL, best known for its Internet forums, but also provides email, shell accounts, and web pages.

References

External links

 Shell providers list

Internet hosting

Unix